Pachylioides is a monotypic moth genus in the family Sphingidae erected by Ronald W. Hodges in 1971. Its only species, Pachylioides resumens, was first described by Francis Walker in 1856.

Distribution 
It is found from Argentina, Brazil, Bolivia and Paraguay north through Central America (including Panama, Costa Rica and Mexico) and the West Indies.

Biology 
Adults are on wing in several generations in the tropics.

The larvae feed on Echites umbellata, Ficus carica and other Ficus species.

Gallery

References

External links

Dilophonotini
Moths described in 1856
Monotypic moth genera